Wang Rong may refer to:

 Wang Rong (Jin dynasty) (234–305), Jin dynasty general
 Wang Rong (warlord) (877–921), warlord during the late Tang dynasty and early Five Dynasties period
 Wang Rong (politician) (born 1958), People's Republic of China politician
 Wang Rong (badminton) (born 1984), Chinese badminton player
 Wang Rong (singer) (born 1978), Chinese singer